Talkhig of Shali was a 19th-century Chechen commander. Military and statesman of the North Caucasian Imamate, a native of Shali, a representative of the taip kurchaloy, mudir (general-naib) and head of artillery of the North Caucasian Imamate, naib of the districts of Shali and Greater Chechnya (the first in terms of population and territory of the regions of the Imamate, 290,000 people., 4,200 square versts (up to 7,000 km).

Сhronology 
In August 1845, Talkhig was appointed the leader of Greater Chechnya. From the summer of 1850 until the end of the Caucasian War, the fortification of Talkhig was repeatedly attacked by Russian troops under the command of Major General P. S. Sleptsov, Baron E. I. Meidel, Prince A. I. Baryatinsky, Baron A. E. Wrangel, Baron L. P. Nikolai and Count N. I. Evdokimov.

February 8 - 11, 1849, when cutting a clearing in the direction of the Shali glade, he participated in the battle with the troops of colonels E. I. Meidel and Seryabrekov.

January 24 - March 8, 1850. Cutting of clearing to Shali. Artillery of Talkhig takes part in the battles for the Shali Forest.

January 8 - 24, 1851, when cutting a clearing along the Bass River, Talkhig successfully repulsed the attacks of General L.P. Nikolai on the Shali trenches.

On February 20, 1851, on the Bass River, he took part in the battle against the detachment of General I. A. Vrevsky.

On September 27, 1851 Baryatinsky defeated General Talkhig Shalin at the village of Churtogay. On December 30, 1853, Talkhig participated in the battle against the detachment of Russian Major-General Baklanov at the village of Gordali.

On September 28, 1854, together with Eski Mishchikovsky, Talkhig participated in the battle against the detachment Wrangel on the Argun River.

In 1859 Talkhig gave in and retired. He wrote a chronicle in Arabic. He died from the consequences of wounds received in battles. Talkhig was buried in the village of Shali.

Artillery tactics 

General Talkhig laid the foundation for horse-mountain artillery and one of the earliest inventors of the "Nomadic artillery" tactics refereed today as Shoot-and-scoot according to the Russian historian and professor Nikolay Smirnov.

References

Further reading
 Академия наук Чеченской Республики Институт гуманитарных исследований История Чечни с древнейших времен до наших дней В четырех томах Том III Грозный ФГУП "ИПК «Грозненский рабочий» 2013
 Далхан Хожаев. Чеченцы в Русско-Кавказской войне. Издательство «Седа» 1998 ISBN 5-85973-012-8
 
 Зиссерман А. Л. История 80-го пехотного Кабардинского генерал-фельдмаршала князя Барятинского полка. (1726—1880). Т. 3
 Вилинбахов В. Б. Артиллерия Шамиля. Учёные записки Дагестанского филиала АН СССР, Т. II. Махачкала. 1963.
 Гаджиев В. Г. Военная организация и воинские знаки отличия в государстве Шамиля в книге «Государства и государственные учреждения в дореволюционном Дагестане». Махачкала. 1989.
 Журнал «Воин», «Солдаты» гор. Войско горцев времён имама Шамиля в 1830—1860 гг. № 13-14/2003 Автор публикации: В. В. Стецов.
 Казбек Г. Н. Куринцы в Чечне и Дагестане. 1834—1861 г. Очерк истории 79 пехотного Куринского Его Императорского Высочества Великого Князя Павла Александровича полка. — Тифлис, 1885 С. 302—309.
 Брюховецкий Г. А. 100 лет боевой и мирной жизни 79-го Пехотного Куринского полка 1802—1902 гг. краткие очерки из истории полка для нижних чинов год 1902
 
 
 Круглов А. И.,  Нечитайлов М. В. Вооружённые силы имамата горцев Северного Кавказа (1829—1859 гг.)

Chechen people
Date of birth unknown
Date of death unknown
People of the Caucasian War
Warriors from the Russian Empire
Naibs of Imam Shamil